Allaheh Gurab (also Romanized as Ālāleh Gūrāb; also known as Allāh Gūrāb) is a village in Lulaman Rural District, in the Central District of Fuman County, Gilan Province, Iran. At the 2006 census, its population was 686, in 174 families.

References 

Populated places in Fuman County